"A Boy Named Sue" is a song written by humorist, children's author, and poet Shel Silverstein and made popular by Johnny Cash. Cash recorded the song live in concert on February 24, 1969, at California's San Quentin State Prison for his At San Quentin album. Cash also performed the song (with comical variations on the original performance) in December 1969 at Madison Square Garden. The live San Quentin version of the song became Cash's biggest hit on the Billboard Hot 100 chart and his only top ten single there, spending three weeks at No. 2 in 1969, held out of the top spot by "Honky Tonk Women" by The Rolling Stones. The track also topped the Billboard Hot Country Songs and Easy Listening charts that same year and was certified Gold on August 14, 1969, by the RIAA.

Silverstein's own recording was released the same year as "Boy Named Sue", a single on the album Boy Named Sue (and His Other Country Songs), produced by Chet Atkins and Felton Jarvis.

Content
The song tells the tale of a young man's quest for revenge on a father who abandoned him at three years of age and whose only contribution to his entire life was giving him a guitar and naming him Sue, commonly a feminine name, which results in the young man suffering from ridicule and harassment by everyone he meets. Ashamed of his name, he becomes a hard-hearted nomad as a young man; he swears that he will find and kill his father for giving him "that awful name".

Sue later locates his father at a tavern one summer day in Gatlinburg, Tennessee, and after recognizing him by the scar on his cheek and his evil eye confronts him by saying, "My name is Sue! How do you do? Now you're gonna die!" This results in a vicious brawl that spills outdoors into a muddy street. As the two pull their guns on each other, Sue's father smiles with pride and admits that he is the man ("son of a bitch" in the Johnny Cash version) that named him Sue. Because Sue's father knew that he would not be there for his son, he gave him the name as an act of tough love, believing (correctly) that the ensuing ridicule would force him to "get tough or die". Learning this, Sue makes peace and reconciles with his father. Sue closes the song conceding his father's point of view, but that if he ever has a son, he will name the boy "Bill, or George, any damn thing but Sue" because he "still hate(s) that name."

Structure
The song has an unusual AABCCB rhyme scheme, broken only to mark the midpoint and ending.  The song is performed mostly in the speech-like style of talking blues rather than conventional singing.

Censorship
The term "son of a bitch" in the line "I'm the son of a bitch that named you Sue!" was bleeped out in the Johnny Cash version both on the single and the At San Quentin album, and the final line was also edited to remove the word "damn". Both the edited and unedited versions are available on various albums and compilations. The term "son of a bitch" was edited to "son of a gun" or altogether bleeped out in some versions. When performing the song live in later performances (such as in April 1970 at the White House and in 1994 at the Glastonbury Festival, for example), Cash would himself utter a bleep-censor sound in lieu of the word. The unedited version of the original San Quentin performance is included on later reissues of the At San Quentin album and on Cash's posthumous The Legend of Johnny Cash album. Silverstein does not utter any profanity in his original version, with Sue's father instead identifying himself as the "heartless hound" that named him Sue.

Inspiration
The core story of the song was inspired by humorist Jean Shepherd, a close friend of Silverstein, who was often taunted as a child because of his feminine-sounding name.

The title might also have been inspired by the male attorney Sue K. Hicks of Madisonville, Tennessee, a friend of John Scopes who agreed to be a prosecutor in what was to become known as the "Scopes Monkey Trial".  Hicks was named after his mother, who died after giving birth to him.

In his autobiography, Cash wrote that he had just received the song and only read over it a couple of times. It was included in that concert to try it out—he did not know the words and on the filmed recording he can be seen regularly referring to a piece of paper. Cash was surprised at how well the song went over with the audience. The rough, spontaneous performance with sparse accompaniment was included in the Johnny Cash At San Quentin album, ultimately becoming one of Cash's biggest hits. According to Cash biographer Robert Hilburn, neither the British TV crew filming the concert nor his band knew he planned to perform the song; he used a lyric sheet on stage while Perkins and the band improvised the backing on the spot. While another song, "San Quentin", was expected to be the major new song featured in the concert and subsequent album (so much so the album includes two performances of "San Quentin"), "A Boy Named Sue" ended up being the concert's major find.

Cash also performed it on his own musical variety show, ending the song with the line, "And if I ever have a son, I think I'm gonna name him... John Carter Cash", referring to his newborn son. Cash also performed this variant at the White House in April 1970; in later years, however, he would restore the original "any name but Sue" ending, but change the wording to "if I ever have another son". When Cash performed with The Highwaymen in the 1980s and 1990s, he would end the song by saying "if I ever have another boy, I think I'm gonna name him Waylon, or Willie, or Kris." referring to bandmates Waylon Jennings, Willie Nelson, and Kris Kristofferson.

According to Shel Silverstein's biographer Mitch Myers, it was June Carter Cash who encouraged her husband to perform the song. Silverstein introduced it to them at what they called a "Guitar Pull," where musicians would pass a guitar around and play their songs.

Silverstein later wrote a follow-up named "The Father of a Boy Named Sue" on his 1978 Songs and Stories in which he tells the old man's point of view of the story. The only known recording of the song by a major artist is by Shel Silverstein himself. Various cover artists have covered this song since then.

Charts

Weekly charts

Year-end charts

Certifications

Impact on popular culture

Comedian Martin Mull wrote a parody titled A Girl Named Johnny Cash which was recorded in 1970 by Jane Morgan and reached No. 61 on Billboard's country charts.

MAD Magazine issue No. 137 (September 1970) included a parody titled A Boy Dog Named Lassie, based on the fact that the Lassie movies and TV series employed male Collies in the female title role.

The gender-bending implications of the title have been adapted to explore issues of sex and gender, another use of the popular song title that goes beyond its original scope. The 2001 documentary A Boy Named Sue features a transgender protagonist and uses the song in the soundtrack. A Boy Named Sue: Gender and Country Music is the title of a 2004 book about the role of the gender in American country music.

In Winston Groom's 1986 novel Forrest Gump and its 1995 sequel Gump and Co., the title character explores the world with a male ape named Sue, who had been a NASA test animal. The ape is never mentioned in the 1994 Forrest Gump movie.

In the film Swingers, one of the male characters is named Sue. The name is explained by another character by saying, "his dad was a big Johnny Cash fan."

"A Boy Named Sue" is referenced in the Red Hot Chili Peppers songs "One Big Mob" and "Save This Lady."

The Stone Temple Pilots' song "Crackerman" references "A Boy Named Sue" in the second verse.

Big John Bates did an uptempo cover of the song for a Johnny Cash compilation record in 2009.

References

Songs about parenthood
Shel Silverstein songs
1969 singles
Live singles
Johnny Cash songs
Songs written by Shel Silverstein
Song recordings produced by Chet Atkins
Song recordings produced by Bob Johnston
Columbia Records singles
RCA Records singles
Novelty songs
1969 songs